AMIP may stand for

The Atmospheric Model Intercomparison Project, a climate experiment.
The Area Major Incident Pool, a now-obsolete branch of the British police's Criminal Investigation Department, superseded by the Specialist Crime & Operations.